Karines Reyes is a Dominican-American politician and nurse from the state of New York. A Democrat, Reyes has represented the 87th district of the New York State Assembly, covering Parkchester and Castle Hill, since 2019.

Career
Reyes was born in the Dominican Republic to a Dominican mother and a Puerto Rican father, and immigrated to the United States at age 6. She obtained her degree in nursing in 2013, and has worked as an oncology nurse at the Montefiore Medical Center since 2014.

Electoral history
In June 2018, Reyes announced her campaign for the Assembly's 87th district, vacated by Luis R. Sepúlveda, who had been elected to the State Senate in a special election. After handily defeating two other Democrats in the September primary, Reyes won the general election against Republican Alpheaus Marcus with 94% of the vote.

Personal life
Reyes lives in the Bronx with her two sons.

References

1985 births
21st-century American politicians
21st-century American women politicians
American politicians of Dominican Republic descent
Bronx Community College alumni
Hispanic and Latino American state legislators in New York (state)
Hispanic and Latino American women in politics
Living people
Democratic Party members of the New York State Assembly
Politicians from the Bronx
Women state legislators in New York (state)